The Board of Investment of Sri Lanka (BoI) (Sinhala: ශ්‍රී ලංකා ආයෝජන මණ්ඩලය Shri Lanka Ayojana Mandalaya) is the investment promotion agency of Sri Lanka. It was established in 1992, expanding the scope of the Greater Colombo Economic Commission (GCEC) which was formed in 1978.

References

External links

Investment promotion agencies
Government agencies of Sri Lanka
Economy of Sri Lanka
Government agencies established in 1992
1992 establishments in Sri Lanka